Tulsidanga is a village in the Purba Bardhaman district, West Bengal, India.

History
The village of Tulsidanga is located in the Bhatar tehsil of Burdwan district in West Bengal, India.

Demographics
The total geographic area of village is 363.11 hectares. Tulsidanga features a total population of 2,394 peoples. There are about 524 houses.

Housing

References 

Villages in Purba Bardhaman district